Noor Al Mazroei is a chef and disability rights activist from Qatar, who is an expert on Qatar's culinary heritage. Her specialty is adapting traditional Qatari recipes to provide gluten free and vegan alternatives. She is chef at Rosado Café was taught to cook as a child by her mother and grandmother.

In 2021 she collaborated with Park Hyatt Doha to launch a festive cake for Ramadan. In 2022 she guided David Beckham through Qatar's markets as part of his promotional work for Qatar Tourism.

Prior to her culinary career she was director of a disability service and continues to campaign for increased rights and representation for disabled people. She has an MA in Special Needs Education, as well as a BA in Management Information Systems, both from Qatar University.

References

External links 
 Easy and Quick Margooga with Chef Noor Al-Mazrooai (video)
 Qatar's Culinary Journey (feature)
 Recipe: Celebrate Qatar's National Day with Machboos, Qatar’s national dish (article)
 Chef Noor Al Mazroei | الشيف نور المزروعي (video)

Living people
Year of birth missing (living people)
Qatari women
Qatari activists
Women chefs
Disability rights activists
Qatar University alumni